Max Lundgren (22 March 1937 – 27 May 2005) was a Swedish author of children's books. He debuted in 1962 with the book Hunden som äntligen visslade, and has since written a total of about 50 books. Some of his books have become TV series, among other Pojken med guldbyxorna and his books about fictional Swedish soccer club Åshöjdens BK.

Bibliography
 1962: Hunden som äntligen visslade
 1963: Kandidaterna
 1964: Alla barns ansikten
 1965: Gangsterboken
 1965: Äventyrets fyra färger
 1966: Omin Hambbe i Slättköping
 1967: Pojken med guldbyxorna
 1967: Åshöjdens bollklubb
 1968: Dörrarna låsta inifrån
 1968: Regnbågskriget
 1968: Åshöjden går vidare
 1969: Kris i Åshöjdens BK
 1969: Sagan om Lotta från Dösjöbro
 1969: Ole kallar mej Lise
 1970: Mats farfar
 1971: Sommarflickan
 1971: Åshöjden i kvalet
 1972: Snapphanepojken
 1972: IFK Trumslagaren
 1973: IFK Trumslagaren och Lillis
 1975: IFK Trumslagaren och Chris
 1976: Myrorna
 1978: Ännu minns jag Birthe
 1978: Boken om Birthe
 1978: Lättsinniga berättelser och andra noveller
 1979: IFK Trumslagaren och Lasse
 1979: Våning för fyra
 1980: Matchens hjälte
 1980: Inga Eliasson, affärsbiträde
 1981: IFK Trumslagaren och Jack
 1982: Mitt livs äventyr
 1982: Benny, boxaren
 1982: Hela gänget
 1983: Torsten och Greta
 1984: Benny Boxaren och kärleken
 1985: Max Lundgrens Åshöjdens BK
 1986: Samlade diktförsök
 1987: Djävulens kontrakt
 1987: Benny Boxaren nere för räkning
 1988: Töser!
 1988: På äventyr med Gula hissen
 1989: BK Framåt
 1990: Roseli, älskade Rosa
 1990: Kåsebergaskräcken
 1991: En kort tid av lycka
 1991: Benny Boxaren i Amerika
 1992: Åshöjdens BK
 1992: Drömmen om Mallorca och andra berättelser
 1994: Eriksfält leder med 1-0
 1996: 21 nästan sanna berättelser
 1997: Råttan
 1997: Benny, mästaren
 1999: Dubbelspel
 2003: Lina, Gulan och kärleken
 2004: De magiska handskarna

Awards
 1967: Expressens Heffaklump
 1968: Nils Holgersson Plaque
 1983: 91:an-stipendiet
 1987: ABF:s litteraturpris
 1991: Astrid Lindgren-priset

References

External links
 

1937 births
2005 deaths
People from Landskrona Municipality
Swedish children's writers
Swedish-language writers